Gene Gould (born 10 May 1950) is an Antiguan cricketer. He played in four first-class matches for the Leeward Islands from 1971 to 1975.

See also
 List of Leeward Islands first-class cricketers

References

External links
 

1950 births
Living people
Antigua and Barbuda cricketers
Leeward Islands cricketers